Thomas Hamilton (1906–1964) was a Scottish footballer, who is best known for his time with Rangers. He was a goalkeeper.

Career
Hamilton began his career at Kirkintilloch Rob Roy. He joined Rangers in 1923, but had to wait until 31 October 1925 to make his debut; the gamed ended in a 1–0 away defeat to Raith Rovers.

During the 1928 Scottish Cup Final in front of a crowd of 118,115 he made an important save to deny Celtic's Paddy Connolly whilst the game was goalless. Rangers went on to win the match 4–0 with a brace from Sandy Archibald and Davie Meiklejohn and Bob McPhail scoring one apiece.

Whilst at Ibrox he won five Scottish league championships, four Scottish Cups, two Glasgow Cups and six Charity Cups. He left in 1934 after making 286 appearances for the club in the two major competitions. His final senior club was  Falkirk.

Hamilton won one Scotland cap, in 1932 against England.

References

External links

1906 births
1964 deaths
People from Renfrew
Footballers from Renfrewshire
Scotland international footballers
Rangers F.C. players
Falkirk F.C. players
Kirkintilloch Rob Roy F.C. players
Scottish footballers
Scottish Junior Football Association players
Association football goalkeepers
Scottish Football League players
Date of birth missing
Date of death missing
Place of death missing